Acrocercops insulella is a moth of the family Gracillariidae, known from Saint Vincent and the Grenadines and the Dominican Republic. It was described by Walsingham, Lord Thomas de Grey in 1891.

References

insulella
Moths of the Caribbean
Moths described in 1891